Avengers Assembled! is a role-playing game supplement published by TSR in 1984 for the Marvel Super Heroes role-playing game.

Contents
Avengers Assembled! is a supplement describing 30 sometime members of the Avengers supergroup, 22 of their enemies, the Avengers Mansion, and the super-espionage organization S.H.I.E.L.D. Avengers Assembled is a 32-page book, with a loose cover containing a detailed map of the Avengers' mansion. The text gives details of the mansion, S.H.I.E.L.D., and Nick Fury, 30 superhero characters (two characters have multiple secret identities, and there are only 26 separate characters), two associates of the Avengers, and 22 of their enemies. Each character is illustrated, and there are also pictures of some S.H.I.E.L.D. equipment and personnel.

Avengers Assembled! contains complete character statistics for all the Avengers there have been plus 20-odd of their more regular allies and enemies, including Kang, Ultron, and S.H.I.E.L.D. There are also plans of the Avengers Mansion, high quality Marvel artwork. Avengers Assembled! provides gaming statistics for 30 past and present members of the Avengers superhero team – including the Black Panther, Falcon, Hawkeye, Scarlet Witch, Hulk, and She-Hulk - along with almost two dozen supervillain foes, a couple of friends, and the agents of S.H.I.E.L.D. The supplement also includes a map and key of the Avengers Mansion and data on S.H.I.E.L.D. flying cars, headquarters, and jet fighters. The writeup of each hero or villain includes the name of his super identity, his current status (dead, inactive, etc.), real name if known, origin or classification, ability ranks, variable abilities, powers and talents, equipment/possessions, important people in his life, background and, in a few cases, personality, plus an illustration of the character.

Publication history
MHAC2 Avengers Assembled! was written by Bruce Nesmith, with a cover by Jeff Butler, and was published by TSR, Inc., in 1984 as a 32-page book with an outer folder. Avengers Assembled was TSR's first expansion for Marvel Super Heroes.

Reception
Marcus L. Rowland reviewed Avengers Assembled! for White Dwarf #62, rating it 8/10 overall. He declared: "This is an invaluable reference for any MSH referee, and may appeal to many comic collectors and fans."

Pete Tamlyn reviewed Avengers Assembled! for Imagine magazine. He opined that "Avengers Assembled! will be an essential product for most players of the game". He stated: "Personal preferences aside, the Avengers are probably the ideal group to choose if you are going to run an extended campaign using MSH. There have been so many members and roster changes that your players are almost certain to be able to pick a character each without conflict over who plays which particular favourite, or someone getting lumbered with a character that doesn't suit their style of play." He continued: "There are a few grossly powerful characters among them, and I'd recommend that Thor in particular be kept as an NPC who can rescue the players in times of dire emergency, but the only real wimps, Wasp and Hawkeye, are among the most interesting characters to play. My only complaint is that many of the villains are also very tough, the sort of folks who take on the Avengers single-handed and are normally only defeated thanks to their arrogance and over-confidence, and will therefore be quite difficult for the GM to handle." Tamlyn concluded by saying: "Overall, a much-needed publication which will sell very well."

William A. Barton reviewed the supplement in Space Gamer #70. Barton commented that the character descriptions give "all that any gamer familiar with the Marvel universe would need to portray the character in a game or the GM to use as an NPC". He stated: "This supplement is surprisingly complete in terms of heroes and villains covered, and should be most welcome to Marvel fans who wish to portray Avengers" and that the map of Avengers Mansion "would be of use even to players who wish to create their own 'Avengers'". He commented: "One flay evident in Avengers Assembled is that the length of some of the power write-ups requires the dropping of the background notes on the character – okay for old-time Marvel fans, but a potential problem for newcomers. This makes possession of the 15 Marvel Universe comics a necessity for those without an encyclopedic knowledge of the Marvel universe – something that really should have been avoided". Barton concluded his review by saying, "Overall though, for those interested in superheroic gaming in the worlds of Marvel Comics, Avengers Assembled is a worthy addition to the original game."

References

Marvel Comics role-playing game supplements
Role-playing game supplements introduced in 1984